Black Honey is a British four-piece indie rock band formed in Brighton, England in 2014. The band is composed of lead singer and guitarist Izzy Baxter Phillips, guitarist Chris Ostler, bassist Tommy Taylor, and drummer Alex Woodward, who joined the group after the departure of Tom Dewhurst.

The band released an eponymous self-titled debut EP in late 2014 followed by a self-titled debut album in 2018. The album reached number 33 on the UK Albums Chart. Black Honey released their second album, Written & Directed, in March 2021. The album reached number 7 on the UK Albums Chart.

History

Pre-Black Honey

The band started when Izzy met Chris at university and started to write music together. Originally called 'Whats Your Vice?' from 2009 until 2011, the band went through several lineup changes, originally Izzy B. Phillips on vocals and guitar, Chris Ostler on guitar, Tom Chilton on Bass and Cookie on Drums. The band went through a string of bass players and eventually current band member Tommy Taylor joined 'Whats Your Vice?' on drums. They released a song called 'Vampire'. 

By 2012 they had changed their name to 'Kill Moon', with Izzy, Chris, Tommy (now on bass) and Tom Dew on drums. The band released a series of singles, as well as an E.P. titled 'Jupiter'.

Some of the songs released and/or performed live included:
 Jupiter (Released as a single in 2012 and the title track of their E.P.)
 Home
 I Lie To You
 Black and Blue (released as a single on 12|08|13)
 Shine (released as a single with a music video posted on 23/01/2013
 You Said It All (released on the Boon Magazine compilation in 2014)

Other potential songs include:
 Tear In Your Heart 
 Boot Shaped Bruises
 My Guy
 Not Enough

Black Honey (2014-2020)
Black Honey officially formed in June 2014, releasing their first song under this name, “Sleep Forever”, in the same month. Subsequent songs were released to form a self-titled debut EP, released in November 2014. The EP featured the tracks “Sleep Forever”, “Teenager”, “The Taste” and “Bloodlust”.

The band toured during 2015, as well as playing Focus Wales Festival; Live at Leeds; Live at Glasgow; The Great Escape Festival; Wychwood Festival; Croatia Rocks; Secret Garden Party; 2000 Trees; Y Not Festival; Standon Calling; Kendal Calling; and Sunflower Lounge Birmingham. The band generated a lot of media interest during 2015. 

In April 2015, the single “Spinning Wheel” was released. This was followed by the single “Madonna” the following July. The band were also invited to do a BBC radio 1 Session for Huw Stephens and supported Superfood at The Rainbow Warehouse Birmingham on 8th April 2015.

The band continued to tour in 2016, and supported Catfish and the Bottlemen on their UK tour. In June 2016, they released a second EP titled Headspin. The EP featured the tracks “All My Pride”, “Headspin”, “On Your Time” and “Mocking Swing”.

In Spring 2017, the band embarked on a headline UK tour. The band were in the Netherlands for the NPO 3FM festival later in the year. Black Honey also supported Royal Blood on a UK and Europe arena tour in 2017.

On the 21st September 2018, the bands debut self-titled album Black Honey was released. The band embarked on an autumn tour during this year to promote the debut album. The band were also in Europe for a headline tour later in the year. In November 2018, the band released the single “Crowded City” with an accompanying music video. This single appeared on the self-titled debut album.

In 2019, the band were reported to be writing and recording songs for a second studio album, predicted to be released early 2020. In April 2019, the band were NME front cover stars. The band did a headlining tour during 2019, and also played Live At Leeds and Handmade Festival, Leicester. During this UK tour, the band released YouTube material titled “le Crousti Garçons”, which was just a bit of fun for the fans. The video for the single "Midnight" was nominated at the Berlin Music Video Awards 2019.

The band continued to perform during the year, including sets at Poltimore Festival, Exeter; Dauwpop Fest, Netherlands; Vestrock Fest, Netherlands; Hurricane Festival, Scheeßel, Germany; and Rock Werchter Fest, Belgium. In Summer 2019, the band performed at Y Not Festival, Matlock, UK; Neverworld Festival, Edenbridge, UK; Grape Festival, Slovakia; Summer Well Festival, Domeniul Stirbey, Buftea, Romania; Reading Festival, UK; Leeds Festival, UK; and Lost Village, Lincoln, UK.

A new song titled “I Don’t Ever Wanna Love” was being played in live sets around this time. This song was released as a single in June 2019 with a music video featuring an art deco Ibiza hotel as a backdrop.

Later in 2019, drummer Tom Dewhurst left the band. Alex Woodward later joined the band as the new drummer and percussionist.

Written & Directed (2020-2022)
The band performed their first gig of 2020, with new member Alex Woodward, at the Green Door Store, Brighton on 29th January. In July 2020, the band released the single “Beaches”, the first from their upcoming second album. An accompanying music video was also released, which was produced “in house” by members of the band during COVID-19 restrictions.

In September 2020, DIY Magazine held a week-long 100th issue party. On 9th September 2020, Black Honey held a headline performance at the event under COVID-19 restrictions. A second single was released on 18th September 2020, titled “Run For Cover”. A music video for this single was released on 25th September 2020, which was filmed in an empty working men’s club. The video was directed by Sam Kinsella, and production and styling was handled by Craig Hemming.

Two more singles were later released: “Believer” on 8th January 2021, and “Disinfect” on 19th February 2021. “Disinfect” was released with an accompanying music video.

On 19th March 2021, the band released their second album, titled Written & Directed. The album managed to reach No. 1 on the iTunes UK Albums chart during its release week. The official UK album chart was released on 26th March 2021, with Written & Directed at No. 7 overall. The album achieved No. 1 in the UK independent chart. On the Scottish album chart, the album achieved position No. 3. On the UK vinyl chart and the UK cassette chart, the album held position No. 2. On the UK physical chart, the album held position No. 4.

The band headlined a ten-date UK tour between 23rd September and 13th October 2021

A Fistful of Peaches (2022-)
The band released the single “Charlie Bronson” on 11th August 2022. This was followed by the single “Out Of My Mind” on 4th October 2022, with an accompanying music video. 

On 7th November 2022, the band officially announced the album A Fistful of Peaches, set to be released on 17th March 2023. The band also released the single “Heavy” on the same day, releasing its music video the day after on the 8th November 2022.

Band members
 Izzy Phillips – lead vocals, guitar
 Chris Ostler – vocals, guitar, synthesizers
 Tommy Taylor – vocals, bass guitar
 Alex Woodward – drums

Past band members 
Tom Dewhurst - drums (2014-2019)

Discography

Studio albums
 Black Honey (2018)
 Written & Directed (2021)
 I Like the Way You Die
 Run for Cover
 Beaches
 Believer
 Back of the Bar
 I Do It to Myself
 Disinfect
 Summer '92
 Fire
 Gabrielle

 A Fistful of Peaches (2023)
 Charlie Bronson
 Heavy
 Up Against It
 Out Of My Mind
 Rock Bottom
 Cut The Cord
 OK
 I’m A Man
 Nobody Knows
 Weirdos
 Tombstone 
 Bummer

EPs
 Black Honey (November 2014)
 Sleep Forever
 Teenager
 The Taste
 Bloodlust
 Headspin (April 29th 2016)
 All My Pride
 Headspin
 On Your Time
 Mocking Swing
 All My Pride (2017)
 All My Pride
 Madonna
 Somebody Better
 Sleep Forever
 Spinning Wheel
 Hello Today
 Corinne

Singles
 "Sleep Forever" (Demo) / "Teenager" (Demo) (2014)
 "Spinning Wheel" / "Madonna" (2015)
 "Corrine" / "Mothership" (2015)
 "All My Pride" / "On Your Time" (2016)
 "Hello Today" / "Ghost" (2016)
 "Somebody Better" / "Cadillac" (2017)
 "Bloodlust" / "Ghost" (Acoustic) (2017)
 "Dig" / "Corrine" (Acoustic) (2017)
 "Midnight" / "I Only Hurt the Ones I Love" (2018)
 "Blue Romance" / "Crowded City" (2018)
 "I Don't Ever Wanna Love" (2019)
 "Beaches" (2020)
 "Run for Cover" (2020)
 "I Like the Way You Die" (2020)
 "Believer" (2021)
 "Disinfect" (2021)
 "Fire" (2021)
 "Back of the Bar (Piano Version)" (2021)
 "Charlie Bronson" (2022)
 "Out of My Mind" (2022)
 "Heavy" (2022)

Music videos

Awards and recognition
 The gig at Concorde 2 on 14 October 2018 was lauded in the press as one of the finest of the year.
 The video for "Midnight" was nominated for Best Art Director at the Berlin Music Video Awards 2019.

References

External links
 Black Honey official website
 Black Honey Discogs
 Black Honey Musicbrainz

English rock music groups
Musical groups established in 2014
Musical groups from Brighton and Hove
Musical quartets
English indie rock groups
2014 establishments in England
Female-fronted musical groups